Altoona is a census-designated place (CDP) in Wahkiakum County, Washington, northwest of the town of Cathlamet. The population was 39 as of the 2010 census. The CDP includes the communities of Carlson Landing and Dahlia.

History
Altoona was one of six fish-buying stations and canneries located  within a six mile stretch of the Columbia River in the Grays Bay area. Before the decline of the Columbia River salmon industry during the 1940s, 39 canneries were operating along the lower Columbia River.  Altoona was named after Altona, a city in Germany and a major fish-processing city on the Elbe River, by a Danish immigrant named Hans Petersen. In 1903, Petersen  purchased 830 acres of land and founded the Altoona Mercantile and Fish Company Cannery. By 1910, the Altoona cannery was the fourth largest salmon cannery on the Columbia.
Altoona became a major stop for steamers and fishing boats traveling between Astoria and Portland. Altoona was accessible only by boat; there was no direct road to the town until the early 1950s. In 1935, the Columbia River Packers Association (known today as Bumble Bee Foods) purchased the cannery and moved their headquarters from Cottardi Station, located about 1/2 mile downstream, to Altoona. The town prospered until the decline of the Columbia River salmon industry, which resulted in the closing of the large  Altoona cannery in 1947. The derelict cannery building remained until it collapsed during a windstorm and fell into the Columbia River in the late 1990s. After the cannery shut down, the population of Altoona began to dwindle, and today it has less than 50 residents.

Geography
Altoona is located at  (46.269933, -123.61493).

According to the United States Census Bureau, the CDP has a total area of 5.09 square miles (13.19 km2), all of which is land, while none of it is water.

Climate

Climate

The area sees summers that run a few degrees warmer.
Altoona has a warm-summer Mediterranean climate (Köppen Csb) typical of the North Coast that is characterized by cold, rainy winters and mild and warm summers, with an average temperature of 51°F (13 °C).

Demographics

As of the census of 2010, there were 39 people, 20 households, and 17 families residing in the CDP. The population density was 7.66 people per square mile (2.96/km2). There were 34 housing units at an average density of 6.68/sq mi (2.58/km2). The racial makeup of the CDP was 79.5% White, 0.0% African American, 7.7% Native American, 0.0% Asian, 0.0% Pacific Islander, 0.0% from other races, and 12.8% from two or more races. Hispanic or Latino of any race were 5.1% of the population.

There were 20 households, out of which 5.0% had children under the age of 18 living with them, 85.0% were married couples living together, 0.0% had a female householder with no husband present, and 15.0% were non-families. 15.0% of all households were made up of individuals, and 0.0% had someone living alone who was 65 years of age or older. The average household size was 1.95 and the average family size was 2.12.

In the CDP, the age distribution of the population shows 2.6% under the age of 18, 0.0% from 18 to 24, 7.7% from 25 to 44, 48.7% from 45 to 64, and 41.0% who were 65 years of age or older. The median age was 62.6 years. For every 100 females, there were 116.7 males. For every 100 females age 18 and over, there were 123.5 males.

Education
The Altoona community is part of the Naselle-Grays River Valley School District, a K-12 school district of about 300 students.

External links
Naselle-Grays River Valley School District website

References

Census-designated places in Wahkiakum County, Washington
Census-designated places in Washington (state)